The Olancha Earthquake Sequence (2009) was a consecutive series of three earthquakes, with magnitudes of 5.2, 5.0 and 4.9 respectively, with a number of small shocks between each, to accompany the main "triple shock".
Olancha, California is located in the Inyo County, on route 395 with an elevation of 1,115m. Olancha has had a total of 5334 earthquakes since 1931, the largest occurring in 1998 with a magnitude of 5.2. Owens Valley, is located northeast of Olancha consisting mostly of dry, arid saline lakebed. October the 3rd 2009 at 01:16 UTC marked the first earthquake of the “triple shock” to come, matching the high magnitude of the 1998 earthquake. Over a 48 hour period three earthquakes, considered to be of “moderate size” took place in the Owens Valley, in-between Olancha and Keeler. The three shocks had magnitudes of 5.2, 5.0 and 4.9 respectively, accompanied by smaller earthquakes between each. The Olancha earthquake Sequence initiated local liquefaction, within a 1.2 km area in Owens Valley. This resulted in ‘horizontal ground deformation’, still present in the current landscape.

Geology

Tectonic Setting 
California is made from twelve varying geomorphic provinces. East of the Sierra Nevada Mountain range lays Owens Valley, the long depression town of population 192. This composition of California gives it unique topography, inclusive of the highest and lowest points of the United States, Mount Whitney and Death Valley. The San Andreas Fault is a transform boundary, which lies between the North American Plate and the Pacific Plate and extends 1200 km. A transform boundary in the lithosphere means that two plates create a ‘fracture zone’ and rub against one another, causing stress and resulting in an earthquake. California is located above the San Andreas Fault, and causes the majority of Californian Earthquakes, inclusive of the Olancha Earthquake Series in 2009. Owens Valley (Eastern California) includes both boundaries from the Sierra Nevada Region and the Great Basin, hence becoming susceptible to liquefaction and plate movement. The Sierra Nevada region particularly, allows for the plate to lift oceanic crust resulting in large salt masses and moist air pockets, generating further instability in the region. There are many theories about the origin of the structural landscape of the Owen Valley, a widely reported, and evidence-based one being that the tectonic setting is due to “volcanic-tectonic depressions”  Geographical studies have describes Olancha as lying on “the backbone of California”, and is therefore at high risk of natural disasters occurring.

Sequence of Events  
The Olancha Earthquake series had epicentres southeast of the small town of Lone Pine, past the eastern rise of Sierra Nevada, approximately 290 km north of Los Angeles. The first of the shocks, with magnitude of 5.2 occurred at 6:15 pm at a moderately shallow penetration. Two small aftershocks followed this main tremor of magnitudes 4.7 and 4.9 all within a six-minute time period, according to the US Geological survey. Anthony Guarino, a seismologist at the California Institute of Technology described the sequence of events as, “a very robust sequence, with more intense shaking felt over a wider area and maybe even physical cracks in the ground”, this is largely due to the shallow depth of the shock. Californian earthquakes are between six and ten miles deep so are thus less impactful on the earth’s surface. At approximately 3 o’clock am on the following Thursday the second major earthquake struck with a magnitude of 5, proficient of causing moderate damage to surrounding areas. At least a dozen aftershocks were felt, of extremely small magnitudes, most likely on a “strike-slip fault”. A strike-slip fault is a vertical (or mostly vertical) fracture where large blocks of the earth's crust have mostly moved horizontally, either to the left (left lateral) or to the right (right lateral).

Effects

Liquefaction

Seismically induced liquefaction during the Olancha Earthquake series in 2009 was the dominating effect on the surrounding landscape. . Liquefaction acts in accordance with fluid dynamics, thus turning solid matter into liquid due to surrounding environmental factors. For example sand boiling, ground cracking and lateral spread. Leading scientists and architects have invested their time in creating surfaces, which counteract and/or are non-liquefiable. These mitigation methods have been devised by engineers and involve soil being compacted down through vibro compaction, small vibrations under the earth's surface shake the affected area slightly allowing for the loose, uncompacted sand and soil fragments to become dense. The primary factors contributing to the land liquefaction was due to the Tectonic setting, and extreme climates that California demonstrates. Further, liquefaction is often most common in saturated, low density/ uncompacted sandy soils. The Earthquake that caused the widespread liquefaction from the series, was the first shock, of magnitude 5.2, which was unusual for liquefaction to occur at this magnitude, as scientists hypothesised using the “Seed-Idriss Procedure”. The loss of stiffness and strength in soils and sand creates damage to the foundations of buildings and infrastructure during an earthquake. Shallow liquefaction is the most destructive, alongside a 5.2 magnitude earthquake. The depth of the Olancha Earthquake Series (2009) Liquefaction was approximately 3m in depth causing the surface of the land to change its physical composition and remain in this formation to this current day. The effects of liquefaction on the man-made environment can be highly destructive. In the case of the Olancha Earthquake Sequence natural landscapes surrounded the epicentre with minimal damages to man-made structures, due to the barren surroundings.

Horizontal ground deformation 
Widespread horizontal ground deformation is a result of large 'Peak Ground Accelerations' (PGA's). A PGA is equal to the largest shift between plates in any given earthquake, and is usually larger than a vertical shift, creating more damage. Widespread horizontal ground deformation was a contributing factor in the 1975 Earthquake in Kilauea Volcano, Hawaii, resulting in an extreme 8-metre shift horizontally and 3.5 metres vertically. The scientific connection between the Kilauea Volcanic Earthquake and the Olancha Earthquake sequence stems from movements many kilometres away from the epicentre - where the earthquake is initiated. In Hawaii the magnitude 7.2 earthquake was felt approximately 30 km away west from the epicentre, down the south coast, due to the major 8-metre ground shift taking place.

Research/ reconstruction
The small population (192) in Olancha meant that the Earthquake of highest magnitude on October 3 did not cause any deaths or damage to the sparse surrounding landscape. The continuity of the surface in Owens Valley allowed for the earthquake shock to travel and evidently be felt in Merced, Los Angeles and Las Vegas. The arid landscape has become a place for research, such as scientist and geologists instigating what caused the high level of liquefaction, when it is usually not caused by earthquakes with a magnitude less than 6. In the article ‘Engineering Geology’, a conclusion as too why liquefaction was cause in the Olancha earthquake series is derived, “Liquefaction during small magnitude earthquakes presumably depends on the presence of either or both very susceptible soil and anomalously high ground motion”. The use of paleoliquefaction, alongside experimental design such as the “Seed-Idriss Procedure” in the Owen Valley Region, California has provided scientists as to why the liquefaction occurred at a 5.2 magnitude.

Seismic profiles  

Seismic equipment is used to determine ground motion, displaying these movements on a seismograph. This specific measuring tool can be placed temporarily in order to answer a scientific question and to spark geological interest, they can also be installed permanently in order to investigate the complete structure of the earth's interior. The way a seismograph is attached, is to a large piece of the crust through a frame, allows for the frame to freely move as the earth moves, with the heavy electronics attached to the frame staying in the same position, this is due to its inertia. Thus the comparative motion between the frame and the heavy electronics inside the frame measures the ground motion. In the Owens Valley and Long Valley region five specific seismic devices were read during and after the triple shock sequence. The devices were placed in varying locations and depths between Owens Valley, Olancha and Lone Pine to allow for accurate analysis of the five varying profiles. Seismic profile 1 was measured in a shallow area of the barren landscape and resulted in relatively thin soil and sand, as a result from horizontal ground deformation, leading to an area highly susceptible to seismic liquefaction. The second seismic profile was measured along a 42,000-foot line and suggested that the sand and pre-tertiary bedrock is thousands of metres deep at one end of the Owens Valley and much more shallow at the opposite end, demonstrating the unequal distribution of sand/soil density in the region. Profile number three was measured along a road running east just south of Lone Pine. This road was measured by Gianella of the University of Nevada to have shifted approximately 4.8 metres in the left lateral (horizontal) direction since the large earthquake that struck in 1872. Profile number four indicated apparent dips within the mantle, demonstrating both dense areas of land and sparse areas. Profile number five was run along a road approximately 4 kilometres south of Bishop, a small town located at an elevation of 4150 feet in the Inyo county, the seismograph indicating further uncertainty due to different density readings. This uneven distribution is due to California’s geography, particularly aligning with the San Andreas Fault. For researchers and scientists, it is therefore hard to hypothesis and determines large-scale movements that will occur from earthquakes in the future.

Associated earthquakes 

California is highly susceptible to earthquakes, due to its geographical position, particularly as the region resides on the Pacific and North American plates. Large blocks of land shift causing stress on the surrounding land and resulting in a range from low to high magnitude shocks. 
On the 26th of March in 1872, Owens Valley experienced an earthquake of magnitude 7.2. Scientists have recorded this earthquake to be the "largest historical earthquake in California". According to the 1918 issue of The Bulletin of the Seismological Society of America (BSSA), on July 17, 1918, "a distinct earthquake shock was felt twelve miles southeast of Olancha, Inyo County ... No damage was done". Lucile Jones, a seismologist who has conducted research on the Owens Valley region, stated in a 1995 LA Times article that "Clusters of earthquakes in Rivercrest and the nearby Owens Valley are common" and that she expected that the ongoing Ridgecrest earthquake sequence would result in aftershocks in the high 4 magnitude range.

Connections between earthquake-prone areas and their history of high magnitude shocks have contributed to the latter liquefaction present in the Olancha earthquake sequence in 2009 also assisting with scientific research. In 1872 an earthquake of magnitude 7.4 to 7.9 occurred in Lone Pine, which is located 37 kilometres north of Olancha. The 1872 Lone Pine earthquake also demonstrated horizontal ground deformation, eventuating to a 350,000 m2  graben which eventually was filled with water and named the Diaz Lake. Alongside the ground deformation 27 people were killed and 56 people were injured.

References

External links 
 www.example.com

2009 earthquakes
Inyo County, California
Earthquakes in California